Institute of Chemical Technology (ICT) is a state-funded deemed university in Mumbai, India. The institute also has campuses at Bhubaneswar, Odisha and Jalna, Marathwada. It is focused on training and research in the fields of chemical engineering, chemical technology, and pharmacy. It was established in 1933 and was granted deemed university status in 2008, making it the only state-funded deemed university in India. On 12 February 2018 it was given the status of Category 1 institute with graded autonomy by the Ministry of Human Resource Development and the University Grants Commission (India). It is also an institute with a special status as mentioned in SECTION IV of the Report of the Empowered Expert Committee in 2018.

History

Founding

In 1921, the Sir M. Visvesvaraya Committee recommended an institution of the Faculty of Technology at University of Mumbai and a college of technology in Bombay. The ICT was founded on October 1, 1933, as a University Department of Chemical and Technology (UDCT) of the University of Mumbai by then vice chancellor Sir Vitthal N. Chandavarkar. Since he was also the Chairman of Mill Owners' Association, Chandavarkar was keen on catering to the needs of Mumbai's bustling textile industry. The institute offered admissions to 20 students in two disciplines, textile chemistry and chemical engineering, offering a 2-year Degree course. Robert B. Forster of the University of Leeds became the first Head of the Department on October 26, 1933. Krishnasami Venkataraman was the first Indian director in 1938.

Expansion
The current campus in Matunga was occupied in June 1943, and departments of 'Oils, Oleochemicals and Surfactants', Food Engineering and Technology', and 'Pharmaceutical Engineering and Technology' were established. In 1944, department of Dyestuff Technology was established by Professor Krishnasami Venkataraman, the then director of ICT. In 1946, department of Polymer and Surface Engineering (then called PPV - Paints, Pigments and Varnishes), was established under Professor N.R. Kamath. Dept. of chemistry and general engineering started in 1952. Bachelors in Pharmacy course was launched in 1959, becoming the first course of its kind in the state of Maharashtra.

Modern
The university received partial autonomy from University of Mumbai in 1985 and was conferred the autonomous status on the UDCT in 1994, with concurrence from the Maharashtra State Government and the UGC. UDCT was renamed as the Mumbai University Institute of Chemical Technology (Autonomous) (MUICT) on 26 January 2002. In June 2004, in accordance with the Technical Education Quality Improvement Program (TEQIP) of the Government of India, under which the institute was selected as a Lead Institution, the Government of Maharashtra granted complete autonomy to the institute. On 12 September 2008, it was granted the deemed university status and renamed as the Institute of Chemical Technology.

Institute of Chemical Technology was the first institute to be granted the elite badge by the government of the state of Maharashtra. This along with the centre of excellence status put the institute on a par with other reputable schools such as the Indian Institutes of Technology, Indian Institute of Science and the Indian Institutes of Science Education and Research. It also makes the institute, eligible for various special grants from the union and the state governments. In November 2019, Aniruddha B. Pandit, a senior professor and a Dean at the institute took charge of the post of Vice-Chancellor, succeeding long time director G. D. Yadav.

Campus

The academic building faces Nathalal Parekh Marg. Other buildings including three boys hostels, two girls hostels, faculty and staff apartments are located behind the academic building. The rear boundary of the institute runs along the Rafi Ahmed Kidwai Road. The institute is located opposite to Veermata Jijabai Technical Institute (VJTI).

Satellite campuses
Additional campuses are operational in Bhubaneswar, Odisha in collaboration with Indian Oil Corporation and Indian Institute of Technology Kharagpur (IIT KGP) and another at Jalna, Maharashtra (Marathwada campus). The Bhubaneswar campus of ICT started its academic session on 3 September 2018 at the IIT Kharagpur extension centre. The Bhubaneswar campus was inaugurated initially by the Indian President Ram Nath Kovind on 18 March 2018 and the academic session was inaugurated by Dharmendra Pradhan, Union Minister for Petroleum and Natural Gas and Sanjiv Singh, Chairman of Indian Oil Corporation. A 203 acres Marathwada campus was established with a grant of 397 Crore by the state cabinet of Maharashtra. The foundation stone of the campus was laid on 4 May 2018 by then Chief Minister of Govt. of Maharashtra, Devendra Fadnavis along with others.

Library
Established in 1934, the library was renamed Prof. M M Sharma Library on January 8, 1999. It functions as the central library of the institute and is one of the special collection libraries in the country. The library can boast of rich heritage collection of old classic books and bound volumes dating back to 1930s. It has 38,200 books, 25,290 journals and 10,000 standards and subscribes to 120 international and 25 national journals. Along with the traditional collection, it also has a significant digital collection with access to more than 500 electronic journals as well as databases such as Reaxys, Sci-Finder, Scopus, and Web of science. It performs a dual role of an Academic Library as well as a Research Library, catering to both the in-house students and faculty, and outside technologists and industrialists. It is housed in a separate Ground Plus two-storied building. It is a unique library in India to have its own endowment fund. The library is also a member of E-Shodh Sindhu Consortium. It has MOU with BONET for participating in exchange program devised by MISSAT, DST, New Delhi.

Academics 
ICT offers three degrees at undergraduate level: B.Tech. (Bachelor of Technology), B.Chem.Eng. (Bachelor of Chemical Engineering), B.Pharm. (Bachelor of Pharmacy). The institute offers several courses at the masters level which specialize in Chemical Technology, Chemical Engineering, Pharmacy and general science courses. ICT is accredited by AICTE, NAAC, NBA, NIRF. The off campuses of ICT at Bhubaneswar and Jalna also provide an 5-year Integrated M.Tech. in Chemical Engineering course as Majors and some additional branches as Minors, which is one of a kind in India as it consists of a trimester based system with alternate academic and industry trimesters. The Bhubaneswar Campus has also started an Executive M.Tech. programme which is a joint degree programme of ICT Mumbai and IIT Kharagpur making it the first state public university to provide a joint degree with an IIT in the country.

Faculty and Student Support 

The ICT has sanctioned positions of 108 faculty (29 Professors, 38 Associate Professors and 41 Assistant Professors) and a support staff of 240. There are 114 visiting faculties (who typically are industry researchers), 7 emeritus faculties, and 4 adjuncts. The ICT has a tradition of establishment of endowments with an objective of supporting faculty positions, foreign travel assistance, merit-cum-means scholarships, staff welfare, library, campus development, research fellowships and seed money for research by young faculty. There are 90 faculty endowments in the institute. All these endowments have been established through generous donations by alumni, industries, philanthropists and well wishers. Only part of the interest (up to 50-70%) is used towards the purpose of the endowment and the remaining is invested back into the corpus. There are 22 endowment chairs, as well as 49 visiting fellowships which helps attract the best professionals to the institute from all over the world who interact with UG and PG students, faculty and alumni. The honoraria range from ₹ 5000 to 1.25 lakhs for a period of one day to 15 days. Some eminent faculty from institutes such as MIT, Purdue, Cambridge, Monash, UC Berkeley, UCSB, Montreal have taught UG and PG courses in ICT under these endowments. These lectures will form part of audit courses for research students. Besides, public lectures are organized under each endowment. Each academic year, 251 students are supported through under merit-cum-means scholarships. The range is ₹3000-75,000 per year per person through several endowments, private trust and annual commitments by alumni. All economically deprived students are given assistance in the form of tuition fees, hostel fees, mess bills and travel assistance to present papers in national conferences.

Fellows of Royal Society 
Till date ICT has produced two fellows of Royal Society out of 60 odd fellows from India. One of them is Man Mohan Sharma who has been director of the institute and other is Raghunath Anant Mashelkar, who currently serves as the chancellor. G. D. Yadav, former Vice Chancellor of ICT, Bhalchandra Bhanage, Head of Department of Chemistry and Anant Kapdi, Assistant Professor in the Department of Chemistry, were bestowed with Fellowship of Royal Society of Chemistry.

Rankings 

Internationally, Institute of Chemical Technology was ranked 227 in Asia on the QS World University Rankings of 2023. It was ranked 801–1000 in the world by the Times Higher Education World University Rankings of 2023, 158 in Asia in 2022 and 153 among emerging economies.

It was ranked first among the public universities in the Atal Ranking of Institutions on Innovation Achievements (ARIIA) rankings in 2020. In 2021, the National Assessment and Accreditation Council (NAAC) ranked ICT among the top 3 institutes in Maharashtra alongside Tata Institute of Social Sciences (TISS) and Tata Institute of Fundamental Research (TIFR).

Research
ICT has a strong research culture. In 2008-09 UGC report notices that the institute generated around 50 crores from external sources, which was 8 times the government support. Currently, ICT graduates 100 PhDs annually, which is about 10% of India's engineering PhDs. ICT has strong relationships with the industries and many government as well as industry-sponsored projects take shape in ICT. In 2011, the Ministry of Textiles sanctioned ICT as National Center of Excellence in Sportswear with a grant of 24.5 crore for researching sports-related apparel and goods. With this, ICT has become the first institute in India to conduct research on sports fabrics. ICT hosts several research centers within the campus. These include DBT-ICT (Department of Biotechnology) Center for Energy Biosciences, ICT-DAE (Department of Atomic Energy) Center for Chemical Engineering Education and Research, UGC Networking Resource Centre in Chemical Engineering, and Center for Green Technology.

Department of Chemical Engineering 
The Department of Chemical Engineering has developed groundbreaking technologies which have been translated and used in the real world. The research group of Aniruddha B. Pandit, the current Vice Chancellor developed a method for cleaning and disinfecting stagnant water bodies and industrial effluents from various industries using hydrodynamic cavitation. This method was used to clean the Rankala Lake in Kohlapur, Maharashtra and the Bindusagar Lake in Bhubaneshwar, Odisha (a project inaugurated by the Chief Minister of Odisha in January). His research group has also developed solid-fuel burning stoves, used commonly in rural India, which cause lesser pollution and consume fuel efficiently. Research has also been done to convert keratin waste such as human hair, wool, and poultry feathers into fertilizers, pet, and animal feed using a cheap, eco-friendly and efficient method.

B. N. Thorat is the current Director and Professor of Chemical Engineering of the ICT-IndianOil Odisha Campus Bhubaneswar. He is the winner of NOCIL Award for Excellence in Design and Development of Process Plant and Equipment. During his time in ICT-Mumbai, his guidance to the Mumbai police helped in diffusing a major gas leakage and saved many lives.

Department of Pharmaceutical Sciences and Technology 
The department is working on developing newer therapeutics and novel systems to deliver drugs into the body and has successfully translated several technologies to the industry. The research group of Prajakta Dandekar is one of the very few labs in India working on developing the organ-on-a-chip technology that essentially mimics the functioning of various organs on a small chip, decreasing the reliance on animal testing. The group is also developing novel polymers for the delivery of siRNA into the body for gene therapy. In 2013, Vandana Patravale from the department was awarded $100,000 from the Bill and Melinda Gates Foundation for the development of an eco-friendly nano-vaccine for nasal immunization against brucellosis. The vaccine was successfully developed and an article on the same was published in 2020. The department was also successful in synthesizing the anti-viral drug Favipiravir for use against the SARS-CoV-2 in partnership with the company Lasa Supergenerics Ltd.

Student life

Technological Association
Technological Association (TA), established in 1951, is an organization that conducts co-curricular and extra-curricular activities in ICT. TA is headed by institute's vice-chancellor, (as the President) with a senior professor as the Vice President. TA, a 30-member student body, organizes various activities including the intra- and inter-collegiate festivals and runs various clubs for the students. TA also looks after the student grievances and makes sure that the students at the institute are satisfied.

Entrepreneurship cell
ICT inaugurated its entrepreneurship cell in April 2013 with an inauguration lecture from Ashwin Dani (Founder of Asian Paints) and Yogesh Kothari (Founder of Alkyl Amines). A fellowship for visit to Korea was offered at the time of inauguration. The primary purpose behind the entrepreneurship cell was to accelerate the entrepreneurial culture at ICT. ICT also has international dignitaries visiting regularly for contributing to the research as well as guide students. Some of the international dignitaries include Ahmet Uzumcu, Director General of Organization for the Prohibition of Chemical Weapons. There are more than 500 first-generation entrepreneurs which have come up from alumni and from the portals of ICT.

Campus publications

The Bombay Technologist
The Bombay Technologist is the annual peer-reviewed journal of the institute, started in 1951. The journal publishes technical articles in the thrust areas of science and technology, written by undergraduate as well as graduate students of the institute. It is published by the Technological Association. The Bombay Technologist supports partial travel and registration expenses of students presenting technical papers in India. With the Bombay Technologist Undergraduate Research Program (BTUGRP), ICT has developed the framework for an organized, official and widespread UG research ethic.

The Spirit
The Spirit is the official bimonthly cultural magazine cum newsletter of ICT. There are typically 5-6 issues a year. The newsletter highlights the achievements of students and alumni, has news and information about the institute, and is a platform for students to showcase their art and literary skills. The first issue was released in October 2006.

Hostels
Within the campus walls, four hostel buildings (2 girls' and 2 boys') cater to accommodation needs of 900 students. Hostel No. 1 (built 1951) and No. 5 (a 7-story building occupied in 2005) accommodate approximately 600 male students, while hostel No. 2 (built 1966) and No. 3 (built 1987) accommodate female students. The hostels area has faculty flats, dining halls, a canteen, a health clinic, gym, and play grounds. Appointed faculty wardens are responsible for managing hostel and are assisted by office staff and student staff.

Student festivals
Manzar is the cultural festival of the Institute of Chemical Technology organized by the Technological Association. It has completed 10 years since it first began in 2007, and 2019 saw the 13th edition of this festival. Every year, Manzar proudly hosts a variety of events in music, dance, literary arts and fine arts. The Dance and Fashion Show events are the most popular, with active participation of students from all over the city. Manzar has a social initiative called Awaaz, through which students are able to do their bit for all-round societal development and improvement of underprivileged lives. Apart from all this, Manzar also has the Cultural Night and the Popular Night. Many famous artists have performed on the Manzar stage, including Shaan, Arijit Singh, Farhan Akhtar Kailash Kher, Shankar–Ehsaan–Loy, Fire on Dawson, Raghu Dixit, Shalmali Kholgade, Sachin–Jigar, Niladri Kumar, Lucky Ali, and Armaan Malik. Apart from that, comedians such as Kenny Sebastian, and Biswa Kalyan Rath have also entertained the crowd during Manzar.

Sportsaga is the annual sports festival of the Institute of Chemical Technology, Mumbai organized by the Technological Association. It was established in 2005.

In 2013, the Technological Association (Student Council) of ICT decided that Exergy would be merged with the other technical festivals of the institute, YICC (Young Innovators Choice Competition) and YRC (Young Researchers Competition).  This led to the creation of Vortex – The Chemfest.

Rangotsav is a Conference on Advances in Polymer and Coating, Technical Festival of Polymer and Surface Coating Technology Department.

The division of Fibres and Textiles Processing annually holds Texpression, a cultural festival. Texpression also brings the alumni of the division together to foster camaraderie and network among them.

Rasayanam is the student-led chemistry festival organised by the department of chemistry.

Notable alumni
The institute has produced many first-generation entrepreneurs and academics. Civilian honors awarded to alumni include 3 Padma Vibhushan, 8 Padma Bhushan and 10 Padma Shri awardees. Only two Indian engineers – Raghunath Mashelkar and Man Mohan Sharma - have been elected as Fellows of the Royal Society (FRS), both of whom are alumni of ICT.

Among the notable people who have attended or graduated from ICT are:
Mukesh Ambani, chairman of the Reliance Industries
Ashwin Dani, non-executive vice-chairman of Asian Paints Ltd.
Kinshuk Dasgupta, research scientist at BARC, Shanti Swaroop Bhatnagar prize winner
Haren S. Gandhi, American inventor and engineer, recipient of the U.S. National Medal of Technology and Innovation
Keki Hormusji Gharda, founder of Gharda Chemicals
Nilesh Gupta, managing director of Lupin Limited
Lalita Iyer, journalist, writer and blogger
Jyeshtharaj Joshi, renowned nuclear scientist and chemical engineer, Padma Bhushan awardee, Shanti Swarup Bhatnagar prize-winner, former Director of ICT Mumbai
John Kapoor, former CEO of Insys Therapeutics
Ashish Kishore Lele, chemical engineer and Shanti Swarup Bhatnagar prize-winner, director of CSIR-National Chemical Laboratory at Pune
Raghunath Anant Mashelkar, FRS, Padma Vibhushan, Padma Bhushan and Padma Shri awardee, former Director General of the Council of Scientific & Industrial Research, current chancellor of the ICT Mumbai
Samir Mitragotri, inventor, entrepreneur and researcher, professor at Harvard University
Indravadan Modi, founder of Cadila Pharmaceuticals
Ujwal Nirgudkar, Technical Advisor for Film Preservation, member of Oscars jury
Anant Pai, comic artist, creator of Amar Chitra Katha and Tinkle comics
Madhukar Parekh, co-founder of Pidilite Industries
A. V. Rama Rao, Padma Bhushan and Padma Shri awardee, former Director of CSIR-Indian Institute of Chemical Technology (IICT) at Hyderabad, managing director of Avra Laboratories
Doraiswami Ramkrishna, professor at Purdue University
Vivek Ranade, chemical engineer, Shanti Swarup Bhatnagar prizewinner
Kallam Anji Reddy, Padma Bhushan and Padma Shri awardee founder of Dr. Reddy's Laboratories
Homi Sethna, Nuclear Scientist, Padma Vibhushan, Padma Bhushan and Padma Shri awardee, former chairman of the Atomic Energy Commission of India
Manubhai Shah, former Cabinet Minister of Commerce, Government of India
Man Mohan Sharma, FRS, renowned chemical engineer, Padma Vibhushan and Padma Bhushan awardee, Shanti Swarup Bhatnagar prize-winner, former Director of ICT Mumbai
Narotam Sekhsaria, philanthropist, chairman of ACC Cement and Ambuja Cement Group
 Chandreshekhar Sonwane, Indian American Rocket Scientist
Srinivas, playback singer
Bal Dattatreya Tilak, Padma Bhushan awardee, and director of National Chemical Laboratory Pune
Pramod P. Wangikar, Professor at Department of Chemical Engineering IIT Bombay, N-Bios winner. 
G. D. Yadav, Padma Shri awardee, former Vice Chancellor, ICT Mumbai
Amol Arvindrao Kulkarni-Scientist at National Chemical Laboratory, Pune Shanti Swaroop Bhatnagar award Winner.

References

External links
  
 UDCT Alumni Association

Engineering colleges in Mumbai
All India Council for Technical Education
Deemed universities in India
Chemical research institutes
Chemical industry of India
Educational institutions established in 1933
Universities and colleges in Mumbai
Universities in Maharashtra
1933 establishments in India